The Gypsy Queens is the debut studio album by five piece band, The Gypsy Queens. It was released in the United Kingdom on the November 2, 2012. The album entered the UK Albums Chart at number 46.

Background
Following signing their record deal with London Records (Universal Music) they recorded their debut album with the legendary producer Larry Klein (who has worked with Joni Mitchell, Herbie Hancock and Madeleine Peyroux) in Los Angeles in April 2012. The album features songs such as L'Americano, Aicha, Ventura Highway and Marrakesh Express as well as vocals from Madeleine Peyroux, Graham Nash (Crosby Stills and Nash), Gerry Beckley, Dewey Bunnell and Pianist Booker T.

Track listing

Chart performance

Release history

References

2012 debut albums
The Gypsy Queens albums